Dumitru Seul (born 31 March 1987) is a Moldovan football midfielder who plays for FC Veris.

Club statistics
Total matches played in Moldavian First League: 42 matches - 1 goal

References

1987 births
Moldovan footballers
Living people
Association football midfielders
FC Rapid Ghidighici players
FC Veris Chișinău players